Gabriel Alejandro Gervino (born 25 October 1964) is a former Argentine football player.

He played 3 seasons and 70 games in the Primeira Liga for União de Leiria.

Club career
He made his Primeira Liga debut for União de Leiria on 21 August 1994 as a starter in a 1–2 loss to União da Madeira.

References

1964 births
Footballers from Santa Fe, Argentina
Living people
Argentine footballers
Argentinos Juniors footballers
El Porvenir footballers
Portimonense S.C. players
Argentine expatriate footballers
Expatriate footballers in Portugal
Argentine expatriate sportspeople in Portugal
Liga Portugal 2 players
U.D. Leiria players
Primeira Liga players
F.C. Paços de Ferreira players
S.C. Olhanense players
Association football midfielders